Amna Suraka is a museum in Sulaymaniyah, Kurdistan Region of Iraq.

Prison
From 1979 to 1991, during Saddam Hussein's rule in Iraq, Amna Suraka was the northern headquarters of the Da'irat al-Amn/Directorate of General Security, the Iraqi Interior Ministry's intelligence agency, colloquially referred to as just Amn. Many people were imprisoned there, especially students, Kurdish nationalists, and other dissidents. Many were tortured and raped. During the 1991 Battle of Sulaymaniah Iraqi security officials and soldiers retreated to the Amn headquarters which served as the Baathist stronghold in the city and held off rebels for nearly two days until the prison was captured by Peshmerga forces, following a 2 hour long assault. Rebels summarily executed 300 Amn agents, with angry civilians killing many others. One group of mothers whose sons had been killed at the compound stoned and axed to death 21 Iraqis. In total, between 700 and 800 secret policemen and soldiers were killed, although many conscripts were pardoned and allowed to return to their homes in the south by KDP chief Massoud Barzani. The building has many bullet marks from that battle.

Museum
In 2003, a museum was opened at the site for documenting the human rights abuses under Saddam's rule. The museum is free to attend, open six days a week, and mostly funded by the Patriotic Union of Kurdistan, a political party, and has also received funding from the Talabani family and the Qaiwan Group. The museum exhibits include mannequins demonstrating how people were tortured in the prison and a hall of broken mirrors with 182,000 shards commemorating Kurds killed during the genocidal Anfal campaign, with 4,500 backlights to represent the Kurdish villages destroyed during the campaign. There is also another exhibition on Anfal, with pictures of exhumed bodies and the names of prominent Kurds who were killed or disappeared. A later exhibit is on Peshmerga fighters killed by ISIS.

At the museum, the history of human rights abuses is used in a narrative of Kurdish nationalism. According to Autumn Cockrell-Abdullah, the museum attempts to "constitute the Kurds as a nation and nation-state and to demarcate the boundaries of a Kurdish national identity" by memorializing human rights abuses against Kurds.

In 2013, Vice News reporter Orlando Crowcroft called Amna Suraka "the world's most depressing museum", as well as the biggest tourist attraction in Sulaimaniyya.

References

Further reading
Fischer-Tahir, Andrea. 2012. “The Concept of Genocide as Part of Knowledge Production in Iraqi Kurdistan.” In Writing the Modern History of Iraq: Historiographical and Political Challenges, edited by Jordi Tejel, Peter Sluglett, and Riccardo Bocco, 227–244. Hackensack, NJ: World Scientific.

External links
Official website

Museums in Iraq
Sulaymaniyah
Human rights in Iraq
Kurdish nationalism in Iraq
Human rights museums
Museums established in 2003
2003 establishments in Iraq